Santa and the Three Bears is a 1970 animated feature film, which aired in syndication on television regularly during the holiday season.

The film was originally pitched to TV networks, which rejected it as it lacked a villain, but was then shown in theaters instead. This special has been rerun on TBN, USA Network, FOX Family (now Freeform), and on KTLA channel 5 in Los Angeles. It also received a "blue ribbon" award for Best Family Film at the San Francisco International Film Festival.

The live-action sequences at the beginning and end of the film are often edited out in television reruns. The edited version was later released on VHS in 1992 by Kids Klassics, and distributed by GoodTimes Home Video.

Plot summary 
Two young bears, Nikomi and Chinook, know nothing of Christmas until the local park ranger tells them about the legend, and they become curious to meet Santa Claus. Their mother, Nana, is preparing for Winter hibernation and cynically tells her children there is no Santa, but they are determined to believe. Mother finds it impossible to begin their sleep, since the young cubs wish to stay awake until Santa arrives.

Voice cast 
 Hal Smith as Grandfather, Santa and Mr. Ranger
 Jean Vander Pyl (credited as Jean van der Pyl) as Nana
 Christina Ferra-Gilmore (credited as Annette Ferra) as Nikomi
 Bobby Riha as Chinook
 Joyce Taylor
 Ken Engels
 Beth Goldfarb as Beth
 Brian Hobbs as Brian
 Lenard Keith
 Kathy Lemmon
 Roxanne Poole
 Michael Rodriguez

History 
The theatrical release of the film contains live-action sequences directed by director Barry Mahon, running for around four minutes in total. These sequences feature actor Hal Smith and two young children (Brian Hobbs and Beth Goldfarb) sitting in a cabin and conversing by the fireplace and Christmas tree, and a short montage of mechanical toys, Christmas decorations, and a pet kitten, during the opening and closing credits. The film has been also released by Modern Sound Pictures Inc. with the live-action sequences cut.

Bill Hutten and Tony Love, the film's animators, created another Christmas television special in 1983 named The Christmas Tree Train, also starring a bear cub and a park ranger, which led to a line of specials called Buttons & Rusty.

The film is currently owned by Multicom Entertainment Group.

See also 
 List of American films of 1970
 List of Christmas films

References

External links 
 
 
 

1970 films
1970 animated films
1970 television films
1970s American animated films
1970s children's animated films
1970 television specials
1970s animated television specials
1970s Christmas films
American films with live action and animation
American Christmas films
Animated Christmas films
Christmas television specials
American animated featurettes
Animated films about bears
1970s English-language films